Dolicorhamphus is an extinct genus of pterosaurs from the Middle Jurassic Taynton Limestone Formation and Fuller's Earth Formations of England. The genus contains two species, D. bucklandii and D. depressirostris.

Both species of Dolicorhamphus were assigned to the wastebasket genus Rhamphocephalus, considered a "rhamphorhynchoid" pterosaur. However, the type species of Rhamphocephalus, R. prestwichii, was reinterpreted as a thalattosuchian by O'Sullivan and Martill on 2018, but "R." depressirostris and "R." bucklandii were clearly pterosaurian; the former was considered to be in the Scaphognathinae while the latter was only referred to a more general Rhamphorhynchidae. Andres (2021) resurrected the genus Dolicorhamphus for the two, finding it to be a valid genus of pterosaurs closely related to Klobiodon, although he did not assign a type species. This generic assignment has since been followed by other researchers.

D. bucklandi is based on its holotype, a now lost jaw from the Taynton Limestone Formation that was described as a species of Pterodactylus in 1832, and the list of known specimens are: NHMUK PV R 28610, 32752, 37765, 38014, 38015, 38016, 38017, 38019, 38020, 38025, 40126, 47994, 47999a, 1028, 1029, 1030, 1824, 2637, 6749, 6750 (Steel 2012); OUM J.28275, J.28537, J.283043, which include limb elements that show no crossover with the holotype jaw.

D. depressirostris is based on its holotype, GSM 113723 (a mandible), and NHMUK PV R 40126 (isolated limb elements) and GSM 113723 has been damaged with the right ramus broken off and reattached.

References 

Middle Jurassic reptiles of Europe
Taxa named by Harry Seeley
Fossil taxa described in 1875
Novialoids